John Joseph Anderson (December 14, 1873 – July 23, 1949), nicknamed "Honest John", was a Norwegian-born American professional baseball first baseman and outfielder. He played fourteen seasons in Major League Baseball (MLB) for the Brooklyn Grooms/Bridegrooms, Washington Senators, Brooklyn Bridegrooms/Superbas, Milwaukee Brewers/St. Louis Browns, New York Highlanders, Washington Senators, and Chicago White Sox between 1894 and 1908.

Anderson was the first of only three Major League baseball players to have been born in Norway.

During the  season, he was sold to the Washington Senators, only to be sold back to Brooklyn four months later.  Nevertheless, he managed to have one of his best seasons, leading the National League with 22 triples and also leading the league in slugging percentage and extra-base hits.  Anderson stayed in Brooklyn for the  before being purchased by the Milwaukee Brewers of the newly formed American League.

(In , the American League was still considered a minor league.) As the Brewers' first baseman, he finished second in the league in base hits and doubles, trailing only Nap Lajoie in both categories, ranked third in runs batted in behind Lajoie and Buck Freeman, and was sixth in the league with a .330 average.

He played two seasons in St. Louis and recorded virtually identical .284 batting averages in those years.

On September 24, 1903, Anderson tried to steal second base when the base was already occupied.  This particular mistake was often referred to as a "John Anderson play" in the early part of the century 

Anderson was dealt to the New York Highlanders before the  season in exchange for Jack O'Connor.  He played one full season in New York and batted .278 with the club.  He started the  season in New York but was waived after a slow start.  The Washington Senators (officially a different franchise from the team he played for in 1898) claimed him off of waivers, and he recovered to bat .279 on the season, good enough for ninth in the AL in the midst of the dead-ball era.

He remained in Washington for the next two seasons.  In , Anderson tied for the American League lead in stolen bases with Elmer Flick.  He left Washington after his contract was purchased by the Chicago White Sox for the  season.  Late that season, when the White Sox faced the Cleveland Naps with both involved in a tight pennant race, Anderson would prove to be the last out in the second ever perfect game in MLB's modern era, pitched by Addie Joss in a tight pitching duel that also saw Anderson's future Hall of Fame team mate Ed Walsh strikeout 15 and allow only one run.  Anderson retired from the Major Leagues at the conclusion of the 1908 season.

Anderson retired with a .290 career average, 50 home runs, and 978 runs batted in.  He also finished his career with 124 triples, currently tying him for 91st place all-time in that category.

He died at the age of 75 in Worcester, Massachusetts.

See also 
 List of Major League Baseball career triples leaders
 List of Major League Baseball career stolen bases leaders
 List of Major League Baseball annual stolen base leaders
 List of Major League Baseball annual triples leaders

References

External links 

John Anderson at Baseball Almanac
John Anderson at Baseballbiography.com

1873 births
1949 deaths
Major League Baseball first basemen
Major League Baseball left fielders
Brooklyn Grooms players
Brooklyn Bridegrooms players
Brooklyn Superbas players
Washington Senators (1891–1899) players
St. Louis Browns players
New York Highlanders players
Washington Senators (1901–1960) players
Chicago White Sox players
Milwaukee Brewers (1901) players
Major League Baseball players from Norway
People from Sarpsborg
American League stolen base champions
19th-century baseball players
Haverhill (minor league baseball) players
Worcester (minor league baseball) players
Providence Grays (minor league) players
Norwegian emigrants to the United States